This article shows the rosters of all participating teams at the men's field hockey tournament at the 2015 Pan American Games in Toronto. Rosters can have a maximum of 16 athletes.

Pool A

Argentina
The following is Argentina's men's field hockey squad for the 2015 Pan American Games.

Head Coach: Carlos Retegui

Juan Manuel Vivaldi
Gonzalo Peillat
Juan Gilardi
Pedro Ibarra
Facundo Callioni
Matías Paredes
Joaquin Menini
Lucas Vila
Ignacio Ortiz
Juan Martín López
Nicolas Della Torre
Isidoro Ibarra
Matias Rey
Manuel Brunet
Agustin Mazzili
Lucas Rossi

Cuba
Head Coach: Guillermo Stakeman

Leordan Hernandez (GK)
Yendry Delgado (GK)
Alexander Abreu
Dani Alonso
Vladimir Prado
Darian Valero
Reynaldo Gonzalez
Yoandy Blanco
Maikel Tritzant
Raidel Ortiz
Yoel Veitia
Minel Mrado
Roger Aguilera (c)
Adrian Molina
Marcos Martinez
Yasmany Gutierrez

Trinidad and Tobago
The following is Trinidad and Tobago's men's field hockey squad for the 2015 Pan American Games.

Head Coach: Glen Francis

Christopher Scipio
Aidan de Gannes
Kiel Murray
Solomon Eccles
Stefan Mouttet
Akim Toussaint
Dillet Gilkes
Ishmael Campbell
Darren Cowie
Mickel Pierre
Shaquille Daniel
Jordan Reynos
Tariq Marcano
Kristien Emmanuel
Andrey Rocke
Dominic Young

United States
Head Coach: Chris Clements

Michael Barminski
Tyler Sundeen
Patrick Harris (c)
Alex Grassi
Adam Miller
William Holt (c)
Ajai Dhadwal
Tom Barratt
Christian Linney
Moritz Runzi
Ranjot Sangha
Johnny Orozco
Alexander Cunningham
Mohan Gandhi
Aki Kaeppeler
Christopher Rea (GK)

Pool B

Brazil
Brazil announced their squad on June 15, 2015.

André Luiz Couto
Bruno Paes
Bruno Mendonça
Bruno Sousa
Christopher McPherson
Lucas Paixão
Luis Felipe Réus
Marcos Pasin
Matheus Ferreira
Patrick Van der Heijden
Paul Duncker
Paulo Roberto Junior
Rodrigo Faustino
Stephane Smith
Thiago Dantas
Yuri Van der Heijden

Canada
Canada announced their squad on June 25, 2015.

Brenden Bissett
David Carter
Taylor Curran
Adam Froese
Matthew Guest
Gabriel Ho-Garcia
David Jameson
Gordon Johnston
Ben Martin
Devohn Noronha-Teixeira
Sukhi Panesar
Mark Pearson
Matthew Sarmento
Iain Smythe
Scott Tupper
Paul Wharton

Chile

Richardo Achondo
Prada A. Berczely
Fernando Binder Wiener
Felipe Eggers
Andres Fuenzalida
Ignacio Gajardo
Adrian Henriquez
Thomas Kannegiesser
Seba Kapsch
Vicente Martin Tarud
Fernando Renz
Nicolas Renz
Sven Richter
Martin Rodriguez Ducaud
Raimundo Valenzuela
Jaime Zarhi

Mexico

Francisco Aguilar
Edgar Borquez Silva
Alexis Campillo Lopez
Daniel Castillo Ortiz
Irvin Chavez Gomez
Edgar Garcia Lopez
Roberto Garcia Lopez
Ricardo Garcia Miranda
Jose Hernandez
Ruben Martinez Munive
Pol Moreno Quiroz
Miguel Othon Moreno
Guillermo Pedraza Saenz
Bruno Peraza Garcia
Moises Vargas Garcia
Argenis Vasquez Garcia

References

Rosters